Ana Bjelica (born 3 April 1992) is a Serbian volleyball player who plays for CSM Târgovişte. She is younger sister of basketball players Milko and Milka Bjelica. Her family is Serbian Montenegrin, but, contrary to her siblings, she decided to represent native Serbia instead of Montenegro.

In 2020 she signed for Chinese Beijing BAIC Motor but did not play due to COVID-19 pandemic so she returned to Serbian Železničar Lajkovac, won 2021 Serbian Cup after and joined Polish Radom Radomka in playoff.

Achievements

Clubs
  CEV Cup runner-up: 2009/10
  Serbian volleyball league: 2009/10, 2010/11, 2011/12, 2012/13
  Polish volleyball league: 2013/14
  Serbian Volleyball Cup: 2009/10, 2010/11, 2011/12, 2012/13
 Polish Volleyball Cup: 2013/14
 Campeonato Paulista: 2016
 Brazilian Superliga runner-up: 2016/2017

Inidviual Awards
2010 European Junior Championship - The best scorer
2014 Polish Cup - The best attacker

References

External links
FIVB profile

1992 births
Living people
Serbian women's volleyball players
Sportspeople from Belgrade
Volleyball players at the 2015 European Games
European champions for Serbia
European Games medalists in volleyball
European Games bronze medalists for Serbia
Expatriate volleyball players in Poland
Expatriate volleyball players in Turkey
Expatriate volleyball players in Brazil
Expatriate volleyball players in Switzerland
Serbian expatriate sportspeople in Poland
Serbian expatriate sportspeople in Turkey
Serbian expatriate sportspeople in Brazil
Serbian expatriate sportspeople in Switzerland
Volleyball players at the 2020 Summer Olympics
Olympic volleyball players of Serbia
Medalists at the 2020 Summer Olympics
Olympic medalists in volleyball
Olympic bronze medalists for Serbia
21st-century Serbian women